The following is a timeline of the history of the city of Basra, Iraq.

Prior to 16th century

 638 CE - Military camp established by Utbah ibn Ghazwan per order of Omar ibn al-Khattab.
 646 - Abdallah ibn Amer becomes governor.
 658 - Battle of the Camel.
 664 - Ziyad ibn Abihi becomes governor.
 673 - Ubayd Allah ibn Ziyad becomes governor.
 683 - Uprising against Umayyads.
 684 - The governor Mas'ud ibn Amr is killed by the asāwira under Māh-Afrīdūn
 691 - Abd al-Malik ibn Marwan in power.
 701 - Uprising against the Umayyads.
 772 - Ramparts built.
 820 - Zott conflict.
 868 - Zanj Rebellion.
 871 - City sacked during Zanj Rebellion.
 923 - Qaramitah conflict.
 10th century - Public library active.
 1052 - Traveller Nasir Khusraw visits city.
 1122 - Imad ad-Din Zengi in power.
 1123 - City wall rebuilt.
 1258 - City sacked by Mongols.
 1327 - Traveller Ibn Battuta visits city.
 1411 - Kara Koyunlu in power.

16th-19th centuries
 1546 - Ottomans in power.
 1547 - Basra Eyalet (administrative region) formed.
 1556 - Portuguese attempt to take city.
 1596 - Afrasiyab becomes governor.
 1604 - Population: 50,000 (approximate); number of houses: 10,000 (approximate).
 1645 - English factory in business.
 1668 - City was conquered by the Turks.
 1694 - Muntafiq tribes in power.
 1733 - City becomes part of Baghdad Eyalet (administrative region).
 1763 - British East India Company in business.
 1773 - Epidemic.
 1777 - City besieged by Persian forces led by Sadiq Khan Zand.
 1779 - Turks in power.
 1823 - Population: 55,000 (approximate).
 1832 - Muhammad Ali of Egypt in power.
 1840 - Turks in power.
 1865 - Baghdad-Basra telegraph begins operating.
 1884 - Basra Vilayet (administrative region) formed.

20th century

 1901 - Consulate of Russia established.
 1910 - Cholera and bubonic plague outbreak.
 1911
 Consulate of Germany established.
 Cholera epidemic.
 1913 - Reform Society of Basra founded.
 1914 - Battle of Basra (1914); British in power.
 1915 - April: Turkish forces attempt to take city.
 1919 - Baghdad-Basra Railway in operation.
 1920
 Uprising against British occupation.
 Population: 40,000 (approximate).
 1947 - Population: 101,535.
 1964 - University of Basrah established.
 1965 - Population: 310,950.
 1967 - Basrah Medical College established.
 1982 - July: Iranian forces attempt to take city.
 1984 - Iranian forces attempt to take city.
 1987
 January–February: Iranian forces attempt to take city.
 Population: 406,296.
 1991
 1 March: Uprising against Saddam Hussein.
 Marsh Arab population in city expands.
 1999
 25 January: Bombing by United States forces.
 Uprising.

21st century

 2003
 March–April: Battle of Basra (2003); British forces in power.
 August: Oil strike.
 2004 - 21 April 2004 Basra bombings.
 2005 - July: Oil strike.
 2007
 June: Al-Ashrah Al-Mubashra mosque bombed.
 December: British military occupation ends.
 Population: 1,912,533 (estimate).
 2008 - Battle of Basra (2008).
 2011 - 2011 Basra bombings.
 2012 - 14 January 2012 Basra bombing.

See also
 Timelines of other cities in Iraq: Baghdad, Mosul

References

Bibliography

in English
Published in 19th century
 
 
 
 
 
 . Also: The Makamah of Basra.
 
 

Published in 20th century
 
 
 
 . (Includes description of Basra in the 14th century)
 
 
 
 
 

Published in 21st century

in other languages

External links

 
 

Years in Iraq
 
Basra
basra